Kenneth Stroud may refer to:

 Ken Stroud, author of mathematics textbooks
 Kenny Stroud, English footballer